Conrad in Quest of His Youth is a 1920 American silent comedy-drama film directed by William C. deMille and starring Thomas Meighan. The film is based on the 1903 novel Conrad in Search of His Youth by Leonard Merrick which was adapted and written for the screen by Olga Printzlau. The film survives at the Library of Congress.

Cast
Thomas Meighan as Conrad Warrener
Mabel Van Buren as Nina
Mayme Kelso as Gina
Bertram Johns as Ted
Margaret Loomis as Roslind
Sylvia Ashton as Mary Page
Kathlyn Williams as Mrs. Adaile
Charles Ogle as Dobson
Ruth Renick as Tattie
A. Edward Sutherland as Conrad (at 17) (billed as Eddie Sutherland)

DVD release
Conrad in Quest of His Youth was released on Region 0 DVD-R by Alpha Video on January 28, 2014.

References

External links

1920 films
American silent feature films
Films based on British novels
Films directed by William C. deMille
1920s English-language films
Paramount Pictures films
1920 comedy-drama films
American black-and-white films
1920s American films
Silent American comedy-drama films